Birch is a locality  of a mile to the north-west of Middleton, Greater Manchester in the Metropolitan Borough of Rochdale, England.

The M62 motorway passes close to the village, and Birch Services is located here.

References

Areas of the Metropolitan Borough of Rochdale